The 2012–13 George Washington Colonials men's basketball team represented George Washington University during the 2012–13 NCAA Division I men's basketball season. The Colonials, led by second year head coach Mike Lonergan, played their home games at the Charles E. Smith Athletic Center and were members of the Atlantic 10 Conference. They finished the season 13–17, 7–9 in A-10 play to finish in a three way tie for eleventh place. They lost in the first round of the Atlantic 10 tournament to Massachusetts.

Roster

Schedule

|-
!colspan=12| Exhibition

|-
!colspan=12| Regular season

|-
!colspan=12|Atlantic 10 tournament

References

George Washington Colonials Men's
George Washington Colonials men's basketball seasons